Joseph Servella (23 April 1896 – 25 January 1980) was a French athlete. He competed in the men's individual cross country event at the 1920 Summer Olympics.

References

1893 births
1980 deaths
Athletes (track and field) at the 1920 Summer Olympics
French male long-distance runners
Olympic athletes of France
Place of birth missing
Olympic cross country runners